Level 4 is a studio album from the Japanese pop-rock/trance group Globe, released on March 26, 2003.

It was the only Globe album to feature former X Japan drummer Yoshiki, who joined the band shortly after its previous album, Lights 2. However his only contribution to the album (and to the band) is the single, "Seize the Light". After the album's release, the band members separated for two years to pursue solo projects. When Globe regrouped in 2005, it was without Yoshiki.

As with Lights and its follow-up, Level 4 found the band exploring their techno side. The album only spawned one single, "Get It on Now", featuring lead vocals by Keiko.

Track listing
"Out of (©) Control"
"Get It on Now" feat. Keiko
"Weather Report"
"The Box"
"This Is the Last Night"
"Inside" feat. Marc
"Seize the Light" 
"Blow"
"Compass"

2003 albums
Albums produced by Tetsuya Komuro
Avex Group albums